Malakhera railway station is a railway station in Alwar district, Rajasthan. Its code is MKH. It serves Malakhera. The station consists of 2 platforms. Passenger, Express trains halt here.

References

Railway stations in Alwar district
Jaipur railway division